John T Wright is an American politician and Taxi company proprietor. In 1952 he was elected as a Democrat and the first African American Councilman in Englewood, New Jersey in the predominantly Republican Bergen County.

References

New Jersey Democrats
Living people
African-American people in New Jersey politics
People from Englewood, New Jersey
New Jersey city council members
Year of birth missing (living people)
21st-century African-American people